Ana Luisa Cabrera Villarreal (21 June 1959 – 21 June 2011), known by the stage name Analí Cabrera and also as Chelita, was a Peruvian actress, vedette, athlete, and dancer. She was part of the cast of the hit comedy television program .

Her long and distinguished career was recognized and awarded by the Ministry of Labor and Promotion of Employment.

Biography

Early years
Born on 21 June 1959 in Lima, Analí Cabrera was the eldest daughter of a family of 14.

1980–1999: Risas y salsa
Cabrera jumped to fame in the sketch called , starring along with Antonio Salim in the Saturday comedy program . She also participated in others, such as El Matrimonio, Amor imposible, and La guerra de los sexos.

She was married to Rodolfo Carrión, who played the secretary of El jefecito, for eight years.

Healthy living
After her divorce from Carrión, Cabrera had a 12-year marriage to television producer Luis Carrizales Stoll.

With the purpose of promoting healthy living and sports, she hosted the health program Pónte en forma con Analí and founded her own gym located in San Miguel District.

Death
At approximately 5:35 am on 21 June 2011, her 52nd birthday, Cabrera died of breast cancer in the home of her partner's family, where she had lived for several years. After the news was made public, her followers, friends, several artists, and politicians declared their grief at her death, including the former President Alan García Pérez, who in dialogue with the press said, "We all know the profound significance this girlfriend will always have for all Peruvians. 'Chelita', a girlfriend that all Peruvians would have wanted to have." She was the partner of Havier Arboleda at the time of her death.

Her body was cremated, and then her ashes scattered on  beach. Crowds of people came to the crematorium Jardines de la Paz to express many signs of affection for her family.

Filmography

Television
 1987:  as Graciela 'Chelita' Muchotrigo
 1988–1989: Aeróbicos con Analí
 1993–1994: Las mil y una de Carlos Álvarez 
 1997–1999: , under the direction of Efraín Aguilar
 1997: Adelgace bailando con Analí 
 2005: María de los Ángeles as Verónica

Film
 2010: Rehenes
 2011: La Huerta Perdida

Theater
 2008: Las viejas amistades 
 2009: Uno para las tres
 2010: Sin cuenta de años

References

External links
 

1959 births
2011 deaths
20th-century Peruvian actresses
21st-century Peruvian actresses
Actresses from Lima
Deaths from breast cancer
Deaths from cancer in Peru
Peruvian stage actresses
Peruvian television actresses
Peruvian vedettes